The 1991–92 season is FC Lokomotiv Gorna Oryahovitsa's 6th season in A PFG.

First-team squad 

 27/2
 30/0
 22/1 
 24/1
 7/0
 17/1
 12/2
 17/0
 29/5
 12/0
 6/0
 29/2

 24/0
 19/1
 23/3
 9/0
 15/2
 20/1 
 11/0
 6/0
 9/0
 8/1
 7/0
 1/0

Fixtures

League

The team is finished 11th after 30 games in his fifth "A"group's season.

League standings

Bulgarian Cup

1/16 finals

Lokomotiv GO loss with aggregate: 3–6.

References

External links
  1991–92 A PFG
 Lokomotiv Gorna Oryahovitsa official website

FC Lokomotiv Gorna Oryahovitsa seasons
Lokomotiv Gorna Oryahovitsa